The Awtazavodskaya line is a line of the Minsk Metro. The line opened in 1990 and crosses the city on a northwest–southeast axis. It comprises 14 stations.

Timeline

Transfers

Rolling stock
The line is served by the Mogilyovskoe depot (№ 2), and currently has 27 four carriage 81-717/714 and the modernised 81-717.5M/714.5M trains assigned to it.

References

External links 
Minsk Metro

Minsk Metro
Railway lines opened in 1990